Azinga Fuzile (born 23 July 1996) is a South African professional boxer who challenged once for the IBF super featherweight title in 2021.

Professional boxing record

References

External links
 

1996 births
Living people
South African male boxers
Featherweight boxers
Southpaw boxers
Sportspeople from East London, Eastern Cape